Scott Hammond may refer to:

 Scott Hammond (musician) (born 1973), English drummer
 Scott Hammond (politician) (born 1966), American politician in Nevada
Scott Hammond (ice hockey), played in 1984 Memorial Cup
 Scott A. Hammond, American general

See also
Winfield Scott Hammond